Angelika Steger (born 1962) is a mathematician and computer scientist whose research interests include graph theory, randomized algorithms, and approximation algorithms. She is a professor at ETH Zurich.

Education and career
After earlier studies at the University of Freiburg and Heidelberg University, Steger earned a master's degree from Stony Brook University in 1985. She completed a doctorate from the University of Bonn in 1990, under the supervision of Hans Jürgen Prömel, with a dissertation on random combinatorial structures, and earned her habilitation from Bonn in 1994. After a visiting position at the University of Kiel, she became a professor at the University of Duisburg in 1995, moved to the Technical University of Munich in 1996, and moved again to ETH Zurich in 2003.

Books
Steger is the author of a German-language textbook on combinatorics:
 
and a monograph on the Steiner tree problem:

Recognition
Steger was elected to the Academy of Sciences Leopoldina in 2007.
She was an invited speaker at the International Congress of Mathematicians in 2014.

References

External links

1962 births
Living people
20th-century German mathematicians
Swiss mathematicians
Swiss women mathematicians
German women mathematicians
German computer scientists
Swiss computer scientists
German women computer scientists
Swiss women computer scientists
Theoretical computer scientists
Graph theorists
Stony Brook University alumni
University of Bonn alumni
Academic staff of the University of Duisburg-Essen
Academic staff of the Technical University of Munich
Academic staff of ETH Zurich
Place of birth missing (living people)
20th-century German women